Leroy Welsh was a Republican politician appointed Ohio State Treasurer from 1875–1876.

Leroy Welsh was the son of Isaac Welsh. Isaac Welsh was elected Ohio State Treasurer in 1871, and again in 1873. He died November 25, 1875, and Governor Allen appointed Leroy Welsh to serve the remaining weeks of his second term.

Biography
Leroy Welsh was born in Beallsville, Monroe County, Ohio in March 1844. He moved with his parents to Washington Township, Belmont County, Ohio in 1854. In 1869 he graduated from Ohio Wesleyan University and then studied law at home for a year before entering Cincinnati Law School, where he graduated in 1871. He was chief assistant to his father at the Treasury beginning in 1872, and continued there until he was appointed treasurer following his father's death. He returned home to Belmont County, Ohio early in 1876 when his term ended.

Welsh practiced in Belmont County, and later opened a law office in Columbus, but returned home to die when he fell ill. He died August 20, 1879 in Belmont County.

References

Ohio lawyers
People from Beallsville, Ohio
People from Belmont County, Ohio
Ohio Wesleyan University alumni
University of Cincinnati College of Law alumni
1844 births
1879 deaths
State treasurers of Ohio
Ohio Republicans
19th-century American politicians
19th-century American lawyers